The 2010 Chicago Cardinals season was the third season for the Continental Indoor Football League (CIFL) franchise, but the team's first as the Chicago Cardinals after relocating from Milwaukee where they were known as the Milwaukee Bonecrushers. The Cardinals were able to finish the season with an 0-10 record, and failed to qualify for the playoffs.
The Cardinals replaced the Slaughter in the CIFL, after the Slaughter left that league for the IFL due to a dispute with CIFL management. The Cardinals were formerly known as the Milwaukee Bonecrushers, also of the CIFL, and relocated to Villa Park in 2010. The Cardinals use their name with permission from the original National Football League team, now known as the Arizona Cardinals.

The Cardinals only season was one of utter disappointment. After starting 0-2, they signed Kicker Julie Harshbarger, the 2nd female Kicker in the CIFL history. (The other being Katie Hnida of the Fort Wayne FireHawks) After a successful soccer career at Benedictine University and Rockford College, where she was named to several all-conference teams. While Harshbarger was not the first woman to score a point in an indoor football game, she was the first woman ever to score a field goal in an indoor football game. After a 20-58 loss on May 22, and seeing their record drop to 0-8, the Cardinals let several of their best players, including the All-Purpose Player of the Year (Brandon Wogoman), leave the team for the nearby, and contending, Wisconsin Wolfpack.

Standings

Schedule

2010 season schedule

Roster

Stats

Passing

Rushing

Receiving

Regular season

Week 4: vs. Marion Mayhem

Week 5: vs. Marion Mayhem

Week 6: vs. Miami Valley Silverbacks

Week 7: vs. Fort Wayne FireHawks

Week 8: vs. Cincinnati Commandos

Week 9: vs. Wisconsin Wolfpack

Week 10: vs. Cincinnati Commandos

Week 11: vs. Wisconsin Wolfpack

Week 12: vs. Miami Valley Silverbacks

Week 13: vs. Fort Wayne FireHawks

Post-season awards

References

2010 Continental Indoor Football League season
Chicago Cardinals (CIFL) seasons
2010 in sports in Illinois